Alias Julius Caesar is a 1922 American silent comedy film directed by Charles Ray and written by Edward Withers. The film stars Charles Ray, Barbara Bedford, William Scott, Robert Fernandez, Fred Miller and Eddie Gribbon. The film was released in July 1922, by Associated First National Pictures.

Cast      
Charles Ray as Billy Barnes
Barbara Bedford as Helen
William Scott as Harry
Robert Fernandez as Tom
Fred Miller as Dick
Eddie Gribbon as 'Nervy' Norton
Tom Wilson as Mose
Harvey Clark as M. Dumas
Gus Thomas as Harrington Whitney
Milton Ross as Police Sergeant
S.J. Bingham as Detective
Phil Dunham as Billy's Valet 
Bert Offord as Janitor

References

External links
 

1922 films
1920s English-language films
Silent American comedy films
First National Pictures films
American silent feature films
American black-and-white films
1922 comedy films
Films directed by Charles Ray
1920s American films